Onorato Timothy O'Meara (January 29, 1928 – June 17, 2018) was an American mathematician known for his work in number theory, linear groups and quadratic forms. He was provost emeritus and professor emeritus of mathematics at the University of Notre Dame.

Life
O'Meara was born in South Africa and graduated from University of Cape Town in 1947. He continued there for a master's degree, then transferring to Princeton University where he obtained the Ph.D. in mathematics in 1953. He then taught at University of Otago in New Zealand for three years. Subsequently he returned to New Jersey and was in the Institute for Advanced Study. He joined University of Notre Dame in 1962 and became Provost. He is known for his books  Symplectic Groups,  Introduction to Quadratic Forms, and The Classical Groups and K-Theory (co-author).

In 2008, the University of Notre Dame Mathematics Library was rededicated and named in O'Meara's honor.

O'Meara died on June 17, 2018, aged 90.

Works

Selected articles

 with Barth Pollak:

Books
 1963, 2000: Introduction to Quadratic Forms, Classics in Mathematics Springer, 
 1974: Lectures on Linear Groups, American Mathematical Society, 
 1978: Symplectic Groups American Mathematical Society, 
 1989: (with Alexander Hahn) The Classical Groups and K-Theory Springer,

See also 

 Symplectic group
 Classical groups
 K-theory

References 

 "Realizing Fr. Ted's Vision" by Alexander J. Hahn

External links 

1928 births
2018 deaths
Writers from Cape Town
Princeton University alumni
20th-century American mathematicians
University of Notre Dame faculty